The poplar-1 RNA motif is a conserved RNA structure that was discovered by bioinformatics.
As of 2018, all known examples of the poplar-1 motif are found in metagenomic sequences; no poplar-1 RNA has yet been found in a classified organism.  Poplar-1 RNAs were particularly common in a metagenomic sample from decaying yellow poplar tree wood chips.

Poplar-1 RNAs generally occur in sequencing contigs that are relatively small.  Therefore, there is not enough information on surrounding genes to be able to determine whether poplar-1 RNAs are likely to function as cis-regulatory elements or whether they more likely operate in trans as small RNAs.

References

Non-coding RNA